Oslo New University College is a private, regional college offering courses at bachelor and masters level in health sciences, psychology, economics, digital marketing and humanities. Based in St. Hanshaugen in Oslo, Norway, the college has an enrollment of 2,800 students, including those studying via the Internet.

Programs offered is psychology, medical foundation, peace and conflict studies, economics and marketing, as well as bachelor programs in nutrition, and peace and conflict studies. Bi-national programs offer up to one year of studies in Oslo, with the rest at foreign universities. Programs consist of medicine, physiotherapy, chiropractic studies and peace and conflict studies.

External links 
 website

Universities and colleges in Norway
Education in Oslo
Educational institutions established in 1998
1998 establishments in Norway